Li Hongming (born September 1957) is a former Chinese politician who spent his entire career in north China's Anhui province. He was investigated by China's top anti-graft agency in November 2022. Previously he served as chairperson of Agriculture and Rural Committee of Anhui Provincial People's Congress.

He was a representative of the 18th National Congress of the Chinese Communist Party. He was a delegate to the 11th National People's Congress.

Early life and education
Li was born in Julu County, Hebei, in September 1957, and graduated from Hefei University of Technology in 1982. He also studied at the University of Science and Technology of China.

Career
He entered the workforce in April 1975, and joined the Chinese Communist Party (CCP) in August 1976. He assumed various posts in Anhui Provincial Government for a long time. In September 2003, he became mayor of Huangshan City. He was appointed party secretary of Suzhou in February 2008, concurrently serving as chairperson of its People's Congress. He was party secretary of Huishang Bank in June 2013, in addition to serving as chairman. In January 2018, he was chosen as chairperson of Agriculture and Rural Committee of Anhui Provincial People's Congress, serving in the post until his retirement in November 2020.

Investigation
On 4 November 2022, he was put under investigation for alleged "serious violations of discipline and laws" by the Central Commission for Discipline Inspection (CCDI), the party's internal disciplinary body, and the National Supervisory Commission, the highest anti-corruption agency of China. Up to now, the three chairmen of the Huishang Bank, Dai Hedi, Li Hongming and Wu Xuemin, have all sacked for graft.

References

1957 births
Living people
University of Science and Technology of China alumni
People's Republic of China politicians from Hebei
Chinese Communist Party politicians from Hebei
Alternate members of the 20th Central Committee of the Chinese Communist Party
Delegates to the 11th National People's Congress